Musothyma is a genus of moths of the family Noctuidae.

Species
 Musothyma cyanastis Meyrick, 1897

References
Natural History Museum Lepidoptera genus database
Musothyma at funet

Hadeninae